The Armstrong Siddeley Screamer was a British rocket engine intended to power the Avro 720 manned interceptor aircraft (Avro's competitor to the Saunders-Roe SR.53 for a rocket-powered interceptor).

Design and development
Work on the Screamer started in 1946, with the first static test at Armstrong Siddeley's rocket plant at Ansty in March 1954. The programme was cancelled, as was the Avro 720, before flight testing.

In 1951, a Gloster Meteor F.8 was experimentally fitted with a Screamer mounted below the fuselage.

The Screamer project was cancelled in March 1956, at a reported total cost of £650,000.

Engines on display 

 A preserved Screamer is part of the engine collection on display at the Rolls-Royce Heritage Trust in Derby.

Specifications

See also

References

External links

 

Aircraft rocket engines
Armstrong Siddeley rocket engines